Noctua janthe, the lesser broad-bordered yellow underwing, is a moth of the family Noctuoidea. Some authors consider Noctua janthe and Noctua janthina to be the same species. It is found in Europe and North Africa.

The wingspan is 30–40 mm. The length of the forewings is 16–20 mm. The ground colour of the forewings varies from bright ochre to gray to brown, often with a reddish or light purple tint. Orbicular and reniform are not clearly marked. The hindwing is orange-yellow with a broad distal black band. This species can only be separated from Noctua janthina by examination of the genitalia. See Townsend et al. 

The moth flies in one generation from late June to September.
The larvae feed on various deciduous trees, shrubs and herbaceous plants.

Notes
The flight season refers to Belgium and The Netherlands. This may vary in other parts of the range.

References

External links
Lepiforum Includes comparison with janthina photos and other diagnostics.
Noctua janthe, at Markku Savela's Lepidoptera and Some Other Life Forms
Fauna Europaea
Vlindernet 
waarneming.nl 
Lepidoptera of Belgium
Lesser broad-bordered yellow underwing, at UKMoths

Noctua (moth)
Moths described in 1792
Moths of Africa
Moths of Europe
Taxa named by Moritz Balthasar Borkhausen